"Body" is a song by Jamaican rapper Sean Paul featuring vocals from American hip hop group Migos. It is the third single from Paul's EP Mad Love the Prequel. The song was released as a digital download on 28 April 2017 by Island Records. The song debuted at number 76 on the UK Singles Chart.

Track listing

Charts

Certifications

Release history

References 

Sean Paul songs
2017 songs
2017 singles
Songs written by Sean Paul
Songs written by Takeoff (rapper)
Songs written by Quavo
Songs written by Offset (rapper)
Island Records singles
Songs written by Mally Mall